Katō District may refer to:

Katō District, Hokkaido
Katō District, Hyōgo